Lost Generation  is a novel series that Turkish writer Hikmet Temel Akarsu penned between the years 1987-1992. The other tag given to this generation who were born between 1955-1965 and had to live through several periods of agitation, economical crises and political conflict is Generation X. The four novels in the series are: “Aleladelik Cagi (The Age of The Ordinary)”, “Caresiz Zamanlar (Desperate Times)”, “Yeniklerin Aski (Love of The Defeated)”, “Sevgili Superi (Dear Superi).”

References

Novels by Hikmet Temel Akarsu
Novel series